The two-pore-domain or tandem pore domain potassium channels are a family of 15 members that form what is known as leak channels which possess Goldman-Hodgkin-Katz (open) rectification. These channels are regulated by several mechanisms including signaling lipids, oxygen tension, pH, mechanical stretch, and G-proteins .  Their name is derived from the fact that the α subunits consist of four transmembrane segments, and each pair of transmembrane segments contains a pore loop between the two transmembrane segments. Thus, each subunit has two pore loops. As such, they structurally correspond to two inward-rectifier α subunits and thus form dimers in the membrane (whereas inward-rectifier α subunits form tetramers).

Each single channel does not have two pores; the name of the channel comes from the fact that each subunit has two P (pore) domains in its primary sequence. To quote Rang and Dale (2015), "The nomenclature is
misleading, especially when they are incorrectly referred to as two-pore channels".

Below is a list of the 15 known two-pore-domain human potassium channels:

See also 
 Ion channel
 Potassium channel

References

External links 
 
 

Ion channels